Josip Križaj may refer to:
Josip Križaj (aviator) (1911–1948), Slovene military pilot
Josip Križaj (opera singer) (1887–1968), Slovene opera singer